"Lewis Takes Action" is the first single from the album Heartland by Canadian musician Owen Pallett. It was released by Domino records in January 2010 in a limited edition on 7" vinyl. It features one track from the album and one exclusive track called "A Watery Day". The official newsletter concerning "Lewis Takes Action" called it a "super limited edition" without giving further details of how many copies were pressed. The single was only sold through the Domino online store; however there was a chance to win a signed copy of the record by downloading the mp3 version of the track "Lewis Takes Action".

Track listing 
7" single (DNO248)
 "Lewis Takes Action" – 2:54
 "A Watery Day" – 4:00

Personnel 
 Lewis Takes Action
 Owen Pallett: electric bass, rings, singing, viola, violin
 Jeremy Gara: kit
 John Marshman: cello
 Ed Reifel: cymbals, snare
 Matt Smith: background vocals
 Rusty Santos: mix
 A Watery Day
 Owen: Moog, violin, mix

References 

2010 singles
Owen Pallett songs
2010 songs
Domino Recording Company singles